Dingyuan Township is a township under the administration of Luoshan County in Henan, China. , it has one residential community and 16 villages under its administration.

References 

Township-level divisions of Henan
Luoshan County